Drummond High School is a public school serving grades 9 through 12 in Drummond, Bayfield County, Wisconsin, United States. It is the only high school in the Drummond Area School District, which serves 720 square miles. The district contains the towns of Barnes, Cable, Delta, Drummond, Grand View, Kelly, Lincoln, Mason, Namakagon, Highland and the Village of Mason.

Demographics
DHS is 92 percent white, three percent Native American, two percent black, two percent Hispanic, and two percent of students identify as a part of two or more races.

Athletics

Athletic teams include: 
Boys Basketball
Girls Basketball
Cross Country
Volleyball

DHS won a state championship in boys cross country in 1976.

References

External links
Drummond School District
Drummond High School
City of Drummond

Public high schools in Wisconsin
Schools in Bayfield County, Wisconsin